Samartín d'Ondes is one of 15 parishes (administrative divisions)  in Belmonte de Miranda, a municipality within the province and autonomous community of Asturias, in northern Spain. 

References

Parishes in Belmonte de Miranda